The 2015 EuroHockey Club Champions Cup was the 43rd edition of the premier European competition for women's field hockey clubs. The tournament will be played in Bilthoven, Netherlands between 3 April and 6 April 2015.

The hosts SCHC won their first title by defeating the defending champions Den Bosch in the final.

Results

Bracket

Quarter-finals

Fifth to eighth place classification

Cross-overs

Seventh and eighth place

Fifth and sixth place

First to fourth place classification

Semi-finals

Third place

Final

Statistics

Final standings
 SCHC
 Den Bosch
 Club de Campo
 Rot-Weiss Köln
 Surbiton
 UCD
 Canterbury
 Izmailovo

Awards
Individual player awards:
Player of the Tournament: Lidewij Welten  Den Bosch
Top goalscorer: Maartje Paumen  Den Bosch
Goalkeeper of the Tournament: María Ruiz  Club de Campo

See also
2014–15 Euro Hockey League
2015 Women's EuroHockey Club Trophy

References

External links
 

EuroHockey Club Champions Cup (women)
EuroHockey Club Champions Cup
EuroHockey Club Champions Cup
International women's field hockey competitions hosted by the Netherlands
EuroHockey Club Champions Cup
EuroHockey Club Champions Cup
Sport in De Bilt